Jewish Lives is a biography series published by Yale University Press and the Leon D. Black Foundation. It was founded in 2006 and the first book was published in 2010.

The series explores the lives of influential Jews from antiquity through the present, including Moses, Albert Einstein, Louis D. Brandeis, Barbra Streisand, David Ben-Gurion, Emma Goldman, and more. 59 titles have been published to date. Three to six biographies are published each year.

Ileene Smith is the editorial director. Steven J. Zipperstein and Anita Shapira are series editors.

Jewish Lives titles have been favorably reviewed by leading publications such as the New York Times and the Wall Street Journal.

In 2014, Jewish Lives won the National Jewish Book of the Year Award, marking the first time the Jewish Book Council awarded a series the prize.

In 2017, the Leon D. Black Foundation launched JewishLives.org, an ecommerce store where Jewish Lives books and collections are sold. The Jewish Lives Podcast was launched in 2019 and over 40 episodes have aired to date

Works in the series 
As of 2022, Jewish Lives includes the following titles:

Antiquity
 Rabbi Akiva: Sage of the Talmud by Barry W. Holtz (2017)
 David: The Divided Heart by David Wolpe (2014)
 Becoming Elijah: Prophet of Transformation by Daniel C. Matt (2022)
 Jacob: Unexpected Patriarch by Yair Zakovitch (2012)
 Moses: A Human Life by Avivah Gottlieb Zornberg (2016)
 Ruth: A Migrant's Tale by Ilana Pardes (2022)
 Solomon: The Lure of Wisdom by Steven Weitzman (2011)

Arts / Culture
 Bernard Berenson: A Life in the Picture Trade by Rachel Cohen (2013)
 Irving Berlin: New York Genius by James Kaplan (2019)
 Leonard Bernstein: An American Musician by Allen Shawn (2014)
 Peggy Guggenheim: The Shock of the Modern by Francine Prose (2015)
 Man Ray: The Artist and His Shadows by Arthur Lubow (2021)
 Jerome Robbins: A Life in Dance by Wendy Lesser (2018)
 Mark Rothko: Toward the Light in the Chapel by Annie Cohen-Solal (2014)
 Alfred Stieglitz: Taking Pictures, Making Painters by Phyllis Rose (2019)

Business
 Julius Rosenwald: Repairing the World by Hasia R. Diner (2017)

Entertainment

 Sarah: The Life of Sarah Bernhardt by Robert Gottlieb (2010)
 Mel Brooks: Disobedient Jew by Jeremy Dauber (2023)

 Hank Greenberg: The Hero Who Didn’t Want to Be One by Mark Kurlansky (2011)
 Ben Hecht: Fighting Words, Moving Pictures by Adina Hoffman (2019)
 Houdini: The Elusive American by Adam Begley (2020)
 Stanley Kubrick: American Filmmaker by David Mikics (2020)
 Stan Lee: A Life in Comics by Liel Leibovitz (2020)
 Groucho Marx: The Comedy of Existence by Lee Siegel (2015)
 Steven Spielberg: A Life in Films by Molly Haskell (2016)
 Barbra Streisand: Redefining Beauty, Femininity, and Power by Neal Gabler (2016)
 Warner Bros: The Making of an American Movie Studio by David Thomson (2017)

Law / Politics
 Ben-Gurion: Father of Modern Israel by Anita Shapira (2014)
 Judah Benjamin: Counselor to the Confederacy by James Traub (2021)
 Léon Blum: Prime Minister, Socialist, Zionist by Pierre Birnbaum (2015)
 Louis D. Brandeis: American Prophet by Jeffrey Rosen (2016)
 Moshe Dayan: Israel’s Controversial Hero by Mordechai Bar-On (2012)
 Disraeli: The Novel Politician, by David Cesarani (2016)
 Emma Goldman: Revolution as a Way of Life by Vivian Gornick (2011)
 Theodor Herzl: The Charismatic Leader by Derek Penslar (2020)
 Jabotinsky: A Life by Hillel Halkin (2014)
 Harvey Milk: His Lives and Death by Lillian Faderman (2018)
 Yitzhak Rabin: Soldier, Leader, Statesman by Itamar Rabinovich (2017)
 Walther Rathenau: Weimar’s Fallen Statesman by Shulamit Volkov (2011)
 Leon Trotsky: A Revolutionary’s Life by Joshua Rubenstein (2011)

Literary Arts
 Hayim Nahman Bialik: Poet of Hebrew by Avner Holtzman (2017)
 Heinrich Heine: Writing the Revolution by George Prochnick (2020)
 Lillian Hellman: An Imperious Life by Dorothy Gallagher (2013)
 Franz Kafka: The Poet of Shame and Guilt by Saul Friedländer (2013)
 Primo Levi: The Matter of a Life by Berel Lang (2013)
 Arthur Miller: American Witness by John Lahr (2022)
 Proust: The Search by Benjamin Taylor (2015)

Philosophy / Religion
 Menasseh ben Israel: Rabbi of Amsterdam by Steven Nadler (2018)
 Martin Buber: A Life of Faith and Dissent by Paul Mendes-Flohr (2019)
 Abraham Joshua Heschel: A Life of Radical Amazement by Julian E. Zelizer (2021)
 Rav Kook: Mystic in a Time of Revolution by Yehudah Mirsky (2013)
 Karl Marx: Philosophy and Revolution by Shlomo Avineri (2019)
 Moses Mendelssohn: Sage of Modernity by Shmuel Feiner (2010)
 Gershom Scholem: Master of the Kabbalah by David Biale (2018)

Rogues

 Sidney Reilly: Master Spy by Benny Morris (2022)
 Bugsy Siegel: The Dark Side of the American Dream by Michael Shnayerson (2021)

Science
 Einstein: His Space and Times by Steven Gimbel (2015)
 Becoming Freud: The Making of a Psychoanalyst by Adam Phillips (2014)
 Admiral Hyman Rickover: Engineer of Power by Marc Wortman (2022)

References

External links 

 Official website

Books about Jews and Judaism
American book series
Multi-volume biographies
Collaborative book series